Ima Ani Lo Rotze Lehigamel (Mother I Do Not Want to Be Weaned) is a 1981 album by Israeli rock band HaClique.

Track list
 "Yeled Mavchena"
 "Ima Ani Lo Rotze Lehigamel"
 "Al Tishal"
 "Golem"
 "Kehut Chushim"
 "Incubator"
 "Mastik Plastik"
 "Sheat Haze'evim"
 "Zochel Al Hagachon"
 "Tzaleket Ktana"
 "Sheled Umlal"
 "Zera Nivun"

References

1981 albums